Ewa Kowalkowska  (born ) is a retired Polish volleyball player, who played as a wing spiker.

She was part of the Poland women's national volleyball team at the 2002 FIVB Volleyball Women's World Championship in Germany, and the 2003 Women's European Volleyball Championship.

She was awarded the best server prize at the 1999 Women's European Volleyball Championship. On club level she played with Palac Bydgoszcz.

Clubs
 Palac Bydgoszcz (2002)

Awards
 Best server 1999 Women's European Volleyball Championship

References

External links
http://www.cev.lu/competition-area/PlayerDetails.aspx?TeamID=2980&PlayerID=19982&ID=108
http://www.todor66.com/volleyball/Europe/Women_2001.html

1975 births
Living people
Polish women's volleyball players
Place of birth missing (living people)
Sportspeople from Bydgoszcz